105.9 Academy FM is a community radio station serving the town of Folkestone in Kent, which launched on 31 March 2011.

The station broadcasts 24 hours a day on 105.9 FM. In spring 2015 OFCOM announced that rules relating to on-air advertising for community radio stations would change, which will enable the station to raise limited funds from this source.

History
The licence for the station was filed with OFCOM in November 2008.

References

Radio stations in Kent
Radio stations established in 2011
Community radio stations in the United Kingdom
Folkestone